River surfing is the sport of surfing either standing waves, tidal bores or upstream waves in rivers. Claims for its origins include a 1955 ride of  along the tidal bore of the River Severn.

River surfing on standing waves has been documented as far back as the early-1970s in Munich, Germany, today offering the world's largest urban surfing spot.

Standing waves
In this type of river surfing, the wave is stationary on the river, caused by a high volume of water constricted by flowing over a rock and creating a wave behind. A requirement for this is a flowing water with shallow depth in which the inertia of the water overcomes its gravity due to the supercritical flow speed (Froude number: 1.7 - 4.5, surpassing 4.5 results in direct standing wave) and is therefore neither significantly slowed down by the obstacle nor pushed to the side. It is a form of hydraulic jump. A river surfer can face up-stream and catch this wave and have the feeling of traveling fast over water while not actually moving.

River surfing conditions are created by a combination of underlying rock formations and specific water levels, i.e. not too much or too little water. Water flow is usually measured in the SI-unit cubic meters per second (m³/s) (alternatively in liters per second or cubic feet per second).

Europe

Germany
Despite being many hundreds of kilometres from the nearest ocean, Munich has a reputation as a surfing hotspot, offering one of Europe's best waves.  The Bavarian capital is the birthplace of river surfing. The city has been the center of surfboard riding on a stationary wave since the early 1970s. Up to 100 surfers daily hit the waves in the city's Englischer Garten, the largest urban park in the world. There, in the river Eisbach, the world's best known river surf spot, the Eisbach wave — literally “ice brook” — the flow velocity of the icy water is about 5 meters per second, at a flow rate of 20 m³/s (equivalent to a mass of 20 tons per second), and the temperature never gets above 15 degrees Celsius. An annual surfing competition is held on the standing wave. Additionally, there are further stationary waves that form on the river Isar just downstream of the Wittelsbacherbrücke bridge in Isarvorstadt, as well as on the canal that joins the Isar channel with the Floßlände.

Munich has produced the best river surfers and was the first location that created a true surfing community around an inland river wave. The scene has around 1,000 active surfers, while 10,000 in Munich will have tried it at some point.

Austria
On Austria's river Mur in Graz (Styria), river surfing is a regular on two waves built for surfing in 2001 and rebuilt in 2004 by KanuClub Graz.
Near Salzburg in the Alm Canal there is a custom built surf wave, the Almwelle.

Norway
Norway has several river waves, amongst the most famous are:
 Bulken Wave (Bulkenbølgen) at Voss.
 Sluppen Wave (Sluppenbølgen) in Trondheim.
 Sarp Wave (Sarpebølgen) in Sarpsborg.
 Rand Wave (Randsbølgen) in Hønefoss.

Several artificial river waves are either under planning or have been considered:
 In Oslo a potential, artificial river wave has been planned in their main city river Akerselva.
 In Stavanger, an artificial river wave for surfboards and kayaks was planned in Figgjoelva, but was opposed by the Norwegian Water Resources and Energy Directorate and the Stavanger and Rogaland Hunting and Fishing Association.
 In Evje a river wave project called the Evje Wave (Evjebølgen) is being planned at the river mouth of Otra, the largest river in the Southern Norway region. The Otra river is already popular for rafting and other extreme sports. Concept drawings have been published, and the project is advertised as having a low environmental impact.

Switzerland 
The Limmat in Zürich does not have any standing waves but is fast-flowing. Local surfers have developed a pulley system known as upstream surfing which allows surfers to surf the river.

North America

Canada

The Habitat 67 standing wave in the Lachine Rapids in Montreal, named for its location adjacent to the Habitat 67 housing complex, has become a popular destination for river surfing. Corran Addison, an Olympic kayaker and three-time world freestyle kayak champion, was the first to surf the Habitat wave in 2002. His river-surfing school, Imagine Surfboards, has taught 3,500 students since 2005. A second Montreal river-surfing school, KSF, has hosted 1,500 students a year since 2003. From fewer than 10 original surfers, it is estimated that the current of participants numbers around 500.

The Ottawa River in Ottawa has long been a river surfing destination for both locals and travellers. Local surf shops specialize in river surfing gear and boards. Average wave height varies between one and two meters. The waves are most accessible in the spring with some remaining rideable year-round.

In the 2000s, transplanted ocean surfers began riding standing waves in a number of rivers in Alberta, Canada. Several shops in Calgary now stock boards specifically designed for river surfing. The standing wave under the 10th Street bridge in Calgary, has been a popular place for river surfing since its formation after the 2013 Alberta floods Since the mid 2010's, the Alberta River Surfing Association is spearheading transformative river wave projects in Southern Alberta, including a river park in downtown Calgary and Cochrane. The most popular area to river surf around Southern Alberta is in Kananaskis district (45 min from Calgary) at a spot called Mountain Wave. As of the early 2020's, projects of building two additional adjustable man-made river waves are well under way.

United States
Jackson Hole, Wyoming, is known as the most famous river surfing community in the US. The first documented cases of surfing on the Snake River occurred in the late 1970s. The wave known as Lunch Counter is a standing wave that churns during times of snow runoff in the months between May and August each year. This wave is highly active during these months and the area continues to grow as a surf destination.

Pueblo, Colorado, has also become a river surfing city. A kayak park was in built 2005 near downtown Pueblo and locals have been surfing features 3, 4, and 7 ever since.

Missoula, Montana, has surfing on Brennan's Wave, a man-made wave on the Clark Fork River.

Boise, Idaho, has surfing at the Boise Whitewater Park near downtown Boise. The Boise River Park features an adjustable man-made wave on the Boise River. Because the waveshaper is adjustable, river surfing is available nearly year around. The Surfer's Journal article "The Surf God's of Idaho" says surfing Boise's river is like "pausing the ocean with a remote control and pressing rewind, but then surfing that backward-flowing wave in forward motion".'

Bend, Oregon, has an adjustable man-made river wave in Bend White Water Rapid Park for all season surfing.

New Zealand
The world's first commercial river surfing operation was started by Jon Imhoof in 1989 . Trips are run on the Kawarau River near Queenstown. Bodyboards are used to run rapids and ride standing waves on the river.

Tidal bores
Large bores can be particularly dangerous for shipping, but also present opportunities for river surfing. The funnel-like shape not only increases the tidal range, but it can also decrease the duration of the flood tide, down to a point where the flood appears as a sudden increase in the water level. The tidal bore occurs only during the flood tide, never the ebb tide.

A tidal bore can create a powerful roar that combines the sounds caused by the turbulence in the bore front and whelps, entrained air bubbles in the bore roller, sediment erosion beneath the bore front and of the banks, scouring of shoals and bars, and impacts on obstacles.

Tidal bores are being surfed along coastal rivers such as the pororoca on the Amazon River or England's River Severn.

Severn bore

Surfing the Severn bore has become a competitive sport with dozens of surfers vying to record the longest ride. The tidal surge also attracts canoeists and windsurfers. The present champion surfer is Dave Lawson from Hempsted, Gloucestershire, who has covered 5.7 miles on a surfboard. His record-breaking surf took more than 35 minutes and was logged by an official adjudicator from the British Surfing Association.

Pororoca bore

The pororoca is a tidal bore, with waves up to 4 metres high that travel as much as 13 km inland upstream the Amazon River.

Petitcodiac bore
Tidal bores are backwards-moving waves that travel upstream over forward-moving downstream waves. They occur twice a day on the Petitcodiac River in the Bay of Fundy, driven up the river by the world's highest tides. The North American record for surfing a single river wave was set by J.J. Wessels and Colin Whitbread of California, who rode the Petitcodiac River bore for 29 kilometres on 24 July 2013.

Upstream river waves 
An upstream river wave is a phenomenon that looks similar to tidal bores, but is caused by ocean swells instead of tides. Similar to tidal bores, they form in the ocean and travel up the river. The Urumea river is an example of a well-known upstream river wave.

Building river surf waves 
River surfing is gaining popularity around the world. Boise Whitewater Park's Wave Technician, Paul Primus, shares the dual benefit of installing recreational river features to replace dangerous low head dams everywhere. Learn more about how building river surf waves can help save lives in Paul Primus' TEDx Talk.

Safety 
Dangers associated with river surfing is hypothermia, drowning and blunt trauma. If the water is cool, the surfer may dress in a wetsuit, neoprene boots and gloves. Even if the temperature is high, it is recommended to use footwear in order to avoid cuts from rocks in the river. Care should also be taken not to stand on the river floor where the water is moving. Some choose not to use a leg rope ("leash") since there is a potential for the rope to get hung up in rocks, which can cause drowning if the surfer is unable to reach the hook-and-loop fastener due to strong currents. Depending on the river, it may also be appropriate to use a personal flotation device and helmet. To reduce danger, the surfer should also train specifically on swimming technique for rivers. When falling, one should try to fall as "flat" as possible so as not to hit rocks lying on the bottom of the river. If the surfing is done with the help of water ski rope or other type of rope fixed to shore, there should be at least one person on shore with a knife, scissors or other cutting tools available in case the rope needs to be cut for safety reasons, for example if the surfer gets tangled in the rope. River surfing is not risk free, and there have been deaths.

See also 
 Lake surfing
 Riverboarding

References

External links
Riverbreak - The River Surf Magazine
RiverSurfing.ca - A global organization for River Surfers by River Surfers
Standings wave in the Eisbach in Munich, Germany
 Red Cedar River Surfing on YouTube
Eisbach NEWS and interviews with the Munich river surfing community
 http://www.idahosurfcompany.com
 Alberta River Surfing Association - https://albertariversurfing.com/

 
Whitewater sports